A country's Reserve Tranche Position (RTP) is the difference between the International Monetary Fund's (IMF) holdings of that country's currency and the country's IMF-designated quota.

Background

The primary means of financing the International Monetary Fund (IMF) is through members' quotas. Each member of the IMF is assigned a quota (membership fee), part of which is payable in special drawing rights (SDRs) or specified usable currencies ("reserve assets"), and part in the member's own currency. The difference between a member's quota and the IMF's holdings of its currency is a country's Reserve Tranche Position (RTP). Reserve Tranche Position is accounted among a country's foreign-exchange reserves. Part of the quota can be withdrawn from the IMF without any interest during critical situations of a country such as Balance of Payment (BOP) crises. This part of the money which can be withdrawn without any interest is the RTP.

See also
 Financial Transactions Plan
 Enhanced structural adjustment facility

References

International Monetary Fund